Lucius Cassius Longinus Ravilla was a Roman politician. He served as consul in 127 BC and censor at the following lustrum in 125 BC.

His first recorded office was that of tribune of the plebs in 137 BC. As a tribune of the plebs, he successfully proposed in the concilium plebis a law to introduce secret ballot for all trials before the Assemblies except those related to perduellio (treason); the bill was supported by Scipio Aemilianus but opposed by the then-consul Marcus Aemilius Lepidus Porcina and his tribunician colleague Marcus Antius Briso.

He served in the praetorship some time before 130 BC, and was elected to the consulship for 127 BC with Lucius Cornelius Cinna. After his consulship, he was elected as censor for 125 BC with Gnaeus Servilius Caepio; during their censorship, they constructed the Aqua Tepula and named Publius Cornelius Lentulus as princeps senatus. 

He was renowned for severity as a iudex and gained fame for formulating the question "Cui bono?" ("Who benefits?") as a principle of criminal investigation. In 113 BC, he was appointed special prosecutor in the case of three Vestal Virgins accused of unchastity under a law passed by one of the tribunes that year. He condemned and put to death two of them – who had been acquitted by the pontifex maximus, Lucius Caecilius Metellus Delmaticus – as well as the men involved; doing so, however, incurred for him some suspicion of political bias.

References 

Sources

 
 
 
 

Ancient Roman jurists
2nd-century BC Roman consuls
Roman censors
Longinus Ravilla, Lucius